Miguel Ángel Nzang Nsue Ngui (born 27 July 1990), sportingly known as Cristián, is an Equatorial Guinean footballer who plays as a left back for Futuro Kings FC and the Equatorial Guinea national team.

International career
Cristián made his formal international debut for Equatorial Guinea in 2015.

References

1990 births
Living people
Association football fullbacks
Association football midfielders
Equatoguinean footballers
People from Bata, Equatorial Guinea
Equatorial Guinea international footballers
CD Elá Nguema players
Deportivo Mongomo players
Deportivo Niefang players
Divisiones Regionales de Fútbol players
Equatoguinean expatriate footballers
Equatoguinean expatriate sportspeople in Spain
Expatriate footballers in Spain
Equatorial Guinea A' international footballers
2018 African Nations Championship players